Queen of Diamonds is a 1991 American drama film directed by Nina Menkes, starring her sister Tinka Menkes.

Cast
 Tinka Menkes as Firdaus
 Emmellda Beech as Best Friend

Release
The film premiered at the Sundance Film Festival in January 1991.

Reception
Glenn Kenny of The New York Times called the film "an urgent portrayal of the tedium of endless transaction." Leslie Combemale of the Alliance of Women Film Journalists rated the film 4.5 stars out of 5 and wrote that it "offers a fascinating look at how a female filmmaker can reframe or manipulate what has, over time, become the traditional visual language of film, in the service of more femme-centric storytelling."

TV Guide wrote that the Menkes' "gift for creating memorable images plays off of Tinka Menkes' restrained but powerful acting to give Queen of Diamonds an impact above and beyond its spare story line." Erika Balsom Cinema Scope wrote that the film "does not quite abide by the reality principle. It hints at how things could be more, could be otherwise-and maybe already are."

References

External links
 
 

American drama films
1991 drama films